Natalimyza is a genus of flies placed in the family Natalimyzidae and known as African grass flies. There are about 30 species in Africa which are found mainly in grasslands where their larvae are thought to feed on decaying plant material.

References 

Brachycera families
Brachycera genera